Louis Chevalier (28 April 1921 – 13 November 2006) was a French racewalker who competed in the 1948 Summer Olympics and in the 1952 Summer Olympics.

References

1921 births
2006 deaths
French male racewalkers
Olympic athletes of France
Athletes (track and field) at the 1948 Summer Olympics
Athletes (track and field) at the 1952 Summer Olympics
Mediterranean Games bronze medalists for France
Mediterranean Games medalists in athletics
Athletes (track and field) at the 1955 Mediterranean Games